Jan Clifford Christiansen (born 8 April 1941) is a Norwegian former football player and coach. He played for Rosenborg BK in Trondheim from 1966 to 1975, earning three league titles and one cup championship. Christiansen was capped 13 times for Norway national football team. Christiansen coached Rosenborg BK in the 1975 season.

Biography
Jan Christiansen came to Trondheim in 1965 as student at the Norwegian Institute of Technology. Prior to this, he had played football for his hometown team Enebakk IF and in the second division for Lillestrøm. From 1966, Christiansen played regularly as midfielder for Rosenborg. In the seasons 1967–1975 while Rosenborg played in the Norwegian top division, Christiansen played 160 matches and scored 25 goals. Christiansen was captain of both Rosenborg BK and the Norwegian national team.

Christiansen was playing coach of Rosenborg BK in the 1975 season, and in the 1976 season he was playing coach of Røros IL. Christiansen is now retired, and lives in Enebakk.

Honours
Rosenborg BK
Norwegian Premier League champion: 1967, 1969, 1971,
Norwegian Premier League runner-up: 1968, 1970, 1973
Norwegian Cup champion: 1971
Norwegian Cup runner-up: 1967, 1972, 1973

References

1941 births
Living people
Norway international footballers
Norwegian football managers
Norwegian footballers
People from Enebakk
Lillestrøm SK players
Rosenborg BK players
Rosenborg BK managers
Eliteserien players
Norwegian Institute of Technology alumni
Association football midfielders
Sportspeople from Viken (county)